The Congress of the State of México is the legislative branch of  the government of the State of Mexico. The unicameral Congress is the governmental deliberative body of  the State of Mexico, which is equal to, and independent of, the executive.

At present it is composed of an assembly of 75 deputies, 45 of whom are elected in electoral districts on a first-past-the-post basis and 30 being elected through a system of proportional representation. Deputies are elected to serve for a three-year term.
Its headquarters are in the Recinto del Poder Legislativo, in the City of Toluca.

See also
List of Mexican state congresses

References 

State of Mexico, Congress of
State of Mexico
Mexico, State
Government of the State of Mexico